Canadian women's football team may refer to:

 Canada women's national American football team
 Canada women's national soccer team